David George Coke Patrick Ogilvy, 8th (or 13th) Earl of Airlie,  (born 17 May 1926) is a Scottish peer. He is also a brother-in-law of Princess Alexandra, The Hon. Lady Ogilvy.

Background and education
Airlie is the eldest son of David Ogilvy, 12th Earl of Airlie and Lady Alexandra Coke. His younger brother was Sir Angus Ogilvy, the husband of Princess Alexandra of Kent. He served as a page to his father at the coronation of King George VI and Queen Elizabeth in Westminster Abbey on 12 May 1937. With the death of Queen Elizabeth II, he is the last surviving participant of the Coronation of George VI and Elizabeth in 1937.

Born in Westminster, David Ogilvy was educated at Eton and served in the Scots Guards during the Second World War. In 1946, he was appointed ADC to the C-in-C and High Commissioner to Austria. He remained in the army until 1950, when he left to attend the Royal Agricultural College in Cirencester, to learn more about estate management. He currently maintains two homes on the family's  estate in Angus: Cortachy Castle and Airlie Castle. He also has a home in Chelsea, London.

Merchant banker
He subsequently took up merchant banking, joining J. Henry Schroder in 1953. He was appointed a director of the company in 1961 and chairman of Henry Schroder Wagg & Co in 1973, and then of Schroders plc from 1977. In 1984, Lord Airlie resigned from Schroder to take up the position of Lord Chamberlain, when he was also sworn of the Privy Council and appointed GCVO. 

Lord Airlie as Lord Chamberlain initiated changes in the early 1990s under the auspices of “The Way Ahead Group”. Under these plans The Queen agreed to pay tax, greater transparency for the public subsidy of the monarchy began and a greater emphasis on public relations started.

He was made a Knight of the Thistle on 29 November 1985. Two years after that he became Chairman of General Accident Fire and Life Assurance plc.

He followed in the footsteps of his late father, who served as Lord Chamberlain to Queen Elizabeth the Queen Mother. He remained in the post until 1997, the same year he was awarded the Royal Victorian Chain. 

Lord Airlie has also served as the Lord Lieutenant of Angus in Scotland, and as the Captain General of The Royal Company of Archers and Gold Stick for Scotland. He was also the founding Chancellor of the University of Abertay Dundee (1994–2009). In 1998, he was asked by the Labour government to stay on as a Lord in Waiting for life.

Lord Airlie's ancestral home in Tayside is Cortachy Castle near the ancient burgh of Kirriemuir, Angus. The castle has served as the family home for more than 500 years. However, in 2014, Lord and Lady Airlie moved out of Cortachy Castle, and their eldest son, who now manages the property, is considering the future of the residence. On 13 November 2007, Buckingham Palace announced Lord Airlie was appointed Chancellor of the Order of the Thistle, following the death of the previous Chancellor, the Duke of Buccleuch. The Countess of Airlie was a Lady of the Bedchamber to Queen Elizabeth II. His grandmother, Mabell, Countess of Airlie, was a Lady-in-Waiting and subsequently Lady of the Bedchamber to Queen Mary.

Family
On 23 October 1952, he married Virginia Ryan. The wedding took place at St Margaret's, Westminster, in the presence of Queen Elizabeth, the Queen Mother and Princess Margaret.

They have six children:
 Lady Doune Mabell Ogilvy (b. 13 August 1953); married Sir Hereward Charles Wake, 15th Bt. on 16 April 1977; they had four children, and divorced in July 1995.
 Lady Jane Fortune Margaret Ogilvy (b. 24 June 1955); married François Nairac on 30 August 1980. The couple have two daughters.
 David John Ogilvy, Lord Ogilvy (b. 9 March 1958); married, firstly, in 1981, Hon. Geraldine Harmsworth, daughter of Vere Harmsworth, 3rd Viscount Rothermere. They had a daughter, Augusta (b. 1981), before divorcing in 1990. Lord Ogilvy married, secondly, in 1991, Tarka Kings, with whom he has three sons; David Huxley, Master of Ogilvy (b. 1991), Joseph (b. 1995) and Michael (b. 1997). 
 Hon. Bruce Patrick Mark Ogilvy (b. 7 April 1959)
 Lady Elizabeth Clementina Ogilvy (b. 4 June 1965); married Jonathan Baring, with whom she has one son.
 Hon. Patrick Alexander Ogilvy (b. 24 March 1971)

In popular culture
He was portrayed by actor Douglas Reith in the 2006 film The Queen in his capacity as Lord Chamberlain, planning the funeral of Diana, Princess of Wales. He was portrayed by actor Martin Turner in the fifth season of The Crown to manage the divorce of Prince Charles and Princess Diana.

Arms

References

External links

Cortachy Castle. Retrieved 21 July 2016.
Domesday Project retrospective archive. Retrieved 21 July 2016.

1926 births
Living people
People educated at Eton College
Alumni of the Royal Agricultural University
Deputy Lieutenants of Angus
Earls of Airlie
Knights Grand Cross of the Royal Victorian Order
Knights of the Thistle
Lord-Lieutenants of Angus
Members of the Privy Council of the United Kingdom
People associated with the University of Abertay Dundee
Scots Guards officers
British Army personnel of World War II
Members of the Royal Company of Archers
Schroders people
David
Airlie